The 9th StarDance series was premiered on October 13, 2018 and ended on December 15, 2018. Hosts in this series are again Marek Eben and Tereza Kostková. Jury Jan Révai was replaced by Václav Kuneš.

Competitors

References 

9
2018 Czech television seasons